Raimar Rodrigues Lopes (born 27 May 2002) is a Brazilian professional footballer who plays as a left-back for Atlanta United 2.

Career

Atlanta United 2
On March 2, 2022, USL Championship side Atlanta United 2 announced that they had signed Raimar. Raimar debuted for Atlanta on May 5, 2022, during a 4-0 loss to Louisville City FC. On June 14, 2022, Raimar was named USL Championship Player of the Week for Week 14 of the 2022 season after scoring both goals in Atlanta's victory over Loudoun United FC.

Honours
Athletico Paranaense
Campeonato Paranaense: 2020

Remo
Copa Verde: 2021

References

External links
 Raimar at playmakerstats.com (English version of ogol.com.br)

2002 births
Living people
Brazilian footballers
Association football fullbacks
Club Athletico Paranaense players
Clube do Remo players
Atlanta United 2 players
People from Manaus
Sportspeople from Amazonas (Brazilian state)
Brazilian expatriate footballers
Brazilian expatriate sportspeople in the United States
Expatriate soccer players in the United States